Sheikh Jassim bin Hamad bin Abdullah bin Jassim bin Muhammed Al Thani (1921 – July 1976 in Denver, Colorado, United States) was the eldest son of Hamad, himself the second son and heir apparent of the ruler of Qatar, but who died (in 1948) before his father. As a result, Jassim's uncle Ali became the first Emir in 1949. 
 
He was appointed in 1958 as the first Minister of Education in Qatar, a position he held until his death in 1976.

On the accession of their first cousin Ali to the Emirate in 1960, Jassim's younger brother, Khalifa, was named as heir apparent. Khalifa deposed Ali in 1972 and replaced him as Emir, and Jassim was never very happy with this state of affairs.

Family 
Jassim bin Hamad had four sons:
Hamad bin Jassim bin Hamad,
Abdelaziz bin Jassim bin Hamad,
Abdallah bin Jassim bin Hamad (Sheikha bint Muhammad bin Hamad bin Abdullah, 4 sons and 3 daughters), and
Fahad bin Jassim bin Hamad.

He also had eight daughters:
Lolwa bint Jassim bin Hamad (m Abdullah bin Khalifah Al Thani, 6 sons and 3 daughters),
Noora bint Jassim bin Hamad (m Abdelaziz bin khalifa bin ali, 2 sons and 5 daughters),
Rodha bint Jassim bin Hamad (m Saud bin Abdelaziz bin Hamad, 4 sons, 3 daughters),
Aisha bint Jassim bin Hamad (m Hamad bin Jassim bin Ali, 3 son and 2 daughter),
Sheikha bint Jassim bin Hamad,
Maryam bint Jassim bin Hamad (m Khalid bin Jassim bin Khalid bin ahmed, 2 sons and 2 daughter), and
Maha bint Jassim bin Hamad (m Muhammad bin Khalifa bin Hamad, 1 son and 4 daughters).

References

External links
Althani tree 

House of Thani
1921 births
1976 deaths
Government ministers of Qatar
Qatari expatriates in the United States